Mykhailo Vasylyovych Hrulenko (1904 – 4 August 1941) was a Czechoslovak, Ukrainian and Soviet politician, who served as the First secretary of the Communist Party of the Stanislav regional committee of the Communist Party of Ukraine.

In 1939 he headed provisional administration on the newly occupied Polish territories (Stanisławów Voivodeship) by the Soviet Union.

In August 1941 Grulenko died at the World War II Eastern Front near Uman, Kiev Oblast.

He has been listed on "decommunization list" in Ukraine.

References

External links
Profile in the Handbook on history of the Communist Party and the Soviet Union 1898–1991

1904 births
1941 deaths
People from Konotop
People from Chernigov Governorate
Central Committee of the Communist Party of Ukraine (Soviet Union) members
First convocation members of the Verkhovna Rada of the Ukrainian Soviet Socialist Republic
20th-century Ukrainian politicians
Soviet military personnel killed in World War II